This Town is the second studio album by Australian country/blues group, Flying Emus. It was released in September 1987.

At the ARIA Music Awards of 1988, the album won the ARIA Award for Best Country Album.

Track listing

References 

1987 albums
ARIA Award-winning albums